Comorn can refer to

 Comorn, Virginia
 Komárom a city in Hungary, and the site of an old strategic fortress often referred to as Comorn in old sources.